The Evangelical Presbyterian Church, Ghana  is a  mainline Protestant Christian denomination in Ghana. It is popularly referred to as the "EP Church". It has strong roots in the Evangelical and Reformed traditions. The denomination's Presbyterian sister church is the Presbyterian Church of Ghana.

History
The Evangelical Presbyterian Church Ghana was founded by German missionaries on 14 November 1847 in Peki. These missionaries from the North German Mission Society (Norddeutsche Mission, Bremen), together with the Basel Mission in 1847, started work among the Ewe people in what is now the Volta Region of Ghana. By the beginning of World War I, they had established two mission stations in the British colony of the Gold Coast and seven in the German territory of Togoland. The first of the mission stations was (Mission-Tove) in present-day Togo.

After the war, Togoland was divided into two territories, the western one under British rule and the eastern one under French rule. The first synod of the mission stations in May 1922, despite the division of Togoland, declared itself to be the supreme governing body of the "Ewe Church". The church adopted the congregational order of the Bremen Mission. In 1923, Scottish missionaries began working in British Togo (Transvolta Togoland), which is the present-day Volta Region of Ghana. The church in French Togoland (now Togo) was run by the Paris Mission.

As a result, development proceeded separately in the two territories, although both churches share the same constitution. They hold a common synod meeting every 4 years.

Church information

Moderator of the General Assembly
The overall leader of the church is known as the Moderator of the General Assembly. The current Moderator of the General Assembly of the church is Reverend Lt. Colonel Bliss Divine Kofi Agbeko. He was inducted in January 2021 at the Dela Chapel of the church at Ho.

Past Moderators of the General Synod
The previous gathering of the churches was known as the General Synod. The first Moderator was elected in 1922, when the Togo and Gold Coast branches of the church held their first Joint Synod. The last Moderator of the General Synod was Rt. Rev. Dr. L.K Buama, whose term ended in 2009.

Very Rev. Andreas Aku  - (1922)                                                          
Very Rev. David Bensah (1923 – 1926)                                         
Very Rev. E. Awuma (1927 – 1939)                                           
Very Rev. B.S. Amegashie (1940 – 1951)                                        
Very Rev. M.W. Akama (1952 – 1956)                                        
Very Rev. E.K. Galevo (1957 – 1968)                                           
Very Rev. A.K. Abutiate (1969 – 1972)                                             
Very Rev. C.K. Dovlo (1969 – 1972)
Very Rev. Noah Komla Dzobo (1981 – 1993)
Very Rev. Japhet Ledo (1993 – 2001)
Very Rev. Livingstone Komla Buama (2001 – 2009)

Past Moderators of the General Assembly
Since 23 August 2008, the church changed from Synod status to General Assembly status. Since then, the Moderator is now officially known as 'The Moderator of the General Assembly'. The first Moderator since this change was the Very Reverend Francis Amenu. Rev. Seth Agidi, who succeeded him, died in office after a short illness at the Ho Teaching Hospital on 10 October 2020.

Very Rev. Francis Amenu (2009 – 2015)
Very Rev. Seth Senyo Agidi (2015 – 2020) Rev. Emmanuel Attu acted as the Moderator for the last two months of Rev. Agidi's term.

Past Synod Clerks 
 Rev. Prof. Christian Gonçalves Kwami Baëta (1945–1949)
 Rev. E.Y. Forson (1960 - 1980)

Education

The church is active in education and has established numerous primary and secondary schools, and a university college. They include:
 Evangelical Presbyterian University College established in 2008
Central Municipal Campus, Ho and the Greenhills Campus at Peki, both in the Volta Region
 E. P. Church Seminary, Peki was the first institution established by the church in 1864.
 E. P. College of Education, Amedzofe, the first teacher training college to be established in 1946
 E.P. College of Education, Bimbilla
 E.P. College of Education, Dzodze
 Mawuli School, Ho, set up by Mr. and Mrs. Trosts, missionaries sent by the United Church of Christ.
 Mawuko Girls Senior High School also at Ho.
 E. P. Senior High School at Hohoe.
 E. P. Senior High School, Saboba
 E. P. Agric. Senior High School, Tatale
 E. P. Technical Vocational Institute, Alavanyo
 E. P. Church Activity Centre, Ho

Health
The EP Church has also been active in providing health care. Its facilities include:
 E. P. Church Hospital, Adidome
 E. P. Church Hospital, Worawora
 E. P. Church Clinic, Wapuli
 E. P. Static Clinic, Ho
 Dan Moser Memorial Clinic, Dambai
 E. P. Church Clinic, Hatorgodo
 E. P. Church Clinic, Dzemeni
 E. P. Church Clinic, Bladjai
 E. P. Church Clinic, Kpalba-Saboba
 E. P. Church Pharmacy, Ho
 E. P. Church IHDN Hospital, Agbozume
 E. P. Church Nazareth Healing Complex, Vane, Avatime

Associations
Christian Council of Ghana - member
World Communion of Reformed Churches - member

Missionaries
One of the last missionaries to work with the Presbyterian church was Ian Strachan of the Church of Scotland. He was also the first headmaster of the E. P. Senior High School at Hohoe.

Partner churches
Eglise Évangélique Presbytérienne du Togo
Church of Scotland
Evangelical Church of Bremen
United Reformed Church - A Ghanaian minister for London (formerly Ghanaian chaplain) works with the URC over four-year term and the church of origin alternates between the Evangelical Presbyterian Church and the Presbyterian Church of Ghana.

See also 
 Presbyterian Church of Ghana
 North German Missionary Society (Bremen Mission)

References

External links and sources
Official Website
Presbyteria Nyanyui Hame le Ghana
Eglise évangélique presbytérienne du Togo
Information about Evangelical Presbyterian Church, Ghana
Global Ministries of the Christian Church (Disciples of Christ) and the United Church of Christ
News from the Ecumenical Committee (United Reformed Church)

Protestantism in Africa
Presbyterian denominations in Africa
Members of the World Communion of Reformed Churches
Members of the World Council of Churches
Christian organizations established in 1922
Presbyterian denominations established in the 20th century
Protestantism in Ghana
Presbyterianism in Ghana